Plaubel is a German camera maker, founded in November, 1902, by Hugo Schrader, who learned the technology of cameras and lenses as an apprentice at Voigtländer in Braunschweig in the late 1800s before being employed by a Frankfurt camera and lens manufacturer and distributor, Dr. R. Krügener, whose daughter he married.  Hugo Schrader and his wife elected to  open their own business, Plaubel & Co., as distributors  and makers of cameras and lenses, naming it after his brother-in-law because he thought Plaubel was easier to remember than Schrader.

Its first product catalog was published for Christmas of 1902 and included cameras of all sizes and makes plus many accessories. In 1912 Hugo Schrader introduced the first Plaubel Makina, a compact bellows camera with a scissors-struts design. It evolved into a press camera before production was stopped 48 years later. In 1908 the Schraders had a son, Goetz, who was to become the future mainstay of the firm. He entered Plaubel in 1925 as an apprentice and became head of the technical department and in charge of camera development in 1930.  A year later he became co-owner with his father. After the death of Hugo Schrader in 1940, Goetz Schrader took over the management of the company.

During World War II Plaubel was converted to manufacture precision military gear but was bombed and seriously damaged in 1944. After World War II ended in 1945, Schrader designed and produced a number of large-format Peco monorail studio view cameras. In 1961 Plaubel introduced the Makiflex and Pecoflex, 9x9cm/6x9cm/6x6cm SLR cameras, with focal-plane shutters and revolving backs, and (together with the American firm Burleigh Brooks) the Veriwide 100, a 6x10cm roll-film viewfinder camera with a fixed ultra-wide lens. In 1975, Schrader sold the company to the Japanese Kimio Doi Group. Plaubel is especially known for their 6x7 Plaubel Makina roll film cameras. In the middle of 1970's, the Makina scissors-strut camera was succeeded by a Japanese-built Makina 6x7 with Nikkor lens, first shown in exhibition in 1977 and released in 1978. The wide-angle "sister", Makina W67 came in 1982. Later the type changed to 670, adding modifications like the 220 film capability and a hot shoe. The company still services and repairs these cameras today but stopped production of the Makina 6x7 in 1986.  Goetz Schrader died in 1997 but Plaubel continued to produce large format monorail cameras like the Peco Profia  until 2017. They also made a 6×9 cm/2-14x3-1/4 inch medium-format Peco monorail view camera for digital and roll film photography (PL69D).

Cameras

Film plates or cut film

Studio View Cameras 
 Peco Junior 9x12, for 9 x 12 cm/10 x 15 cm/4" x 5" large format plates and sheet films, and 2-1/4" x 3-1/4"/ 2-1/4" x 2-1/4" roll film medium formats (1960); bellows view camera on a 320 mm-long (12-1/2") flat optical bench monorail with rack teeth and tripod socket; swings, tilts, and rise/fall/side shifts for front standard, swings and tilts on optical axis for rear standard plus revolving back; detachable bellows allows camera to be folded flat for transport or storage; ground-glass geared focusing; interchangeable leather pleated bellows and wide-angle bag bellows; wire frame for focusing cloth; quick-change lens boards; spirit levels on rear standard; accessory shoes on front and rear standards; all-metal construction of camera standards and monorail; used with plates, sheet-film, roll-film; weight: ca. 2.5 kg (about 5-1/2 lbs) without lens and shutter; 1962 list price, NYC, $239.50 less lens
 Peco Junior 6x9, for 6.5 x 9 cm / 6 x 9 cm / 6 x 6 cm / 4.5 x 6 cm / 2-1/4" x 3-1/4" / 2-1/14" x 2-1/4" medium format plates, sheet film and roll film, and 24 x 36 mm (35 mm) format (1959); bellows view camera on a 250 mm-long (ca. 10") flat optical bench monorail with rack teeth and tripod socket;  rise/fall and side shift (but no swing) on front standard, swings and tilts on rear standard plus revolving back; ground-glass geared focusing; interchangeable leather pleated bellows and wide-angle bag bellows;  collapsible ground-glass hood; quick-change lens boards; spirit level on rear standard; accessory shoes on front and rear standards; all-metal construction of camera standards and monorail; used with plates, sheet-film, roll-film and 35mm cassettes; weight: ca. 1.5 kg (about  3-1/4 lbs) without lens and shutter; 1962 list price, NYC, $160.00 less lens
 Peco Profia, a series of eight large-format bellows view cameras, mounted on optical bench tubular or flat monorails of different lengths, varying in format from 9 x 12 cm (4" x 5") to 18 cm x 24 cm (8" x 10"); model designations for 9 x 12 cm (4" x 5") are "V", "N" and "Z", for 13 x 18 cm (5" x 7") they are "V", "N" and "Z", and for 18 x 24 cm (8" x 10") they are "N" and "Z"; all models introduced between 1967 and 1968; all can be used with plate, sheet-film and roll-film and are capable of smaller formats down to 35 mm with appropriate accessories; ground-glass focusing; all models are distinguished by four vertical tubular poles, two suspending the lens panel between them and two suspending the rear standard between them, enabling independent rise-fall movement of each standard by moving it up and down the poles; all Profia "Z" models provide two extra 10-cm-long pole extensions for increased rise/fall capability; separate controls on each standard for shift, tilt and swivel; revolving back on rear standard; common lens board size (165 x 165 mm) for 90 mm or longer lenses for all models, or wide-angle lens board (120 x 120 mm) with reducing board (165 x 165 mm, recessed 17 mm) for 65 mm to 47 mm super-wide lenses; each model features interchangeable pleated bellows or soft wide-angle bag bellows; detachable bellows allow cameras to be folded flat for transport or storage;  each model offers selection of different interchangeable or extendable monorail lengths (the "V" models have flat rails, the "N" and "Z" models have triple-grooved tubular rails and accept extension rails at each end) which range from 32 cm (approx. 12") to 70 mm (approx. 30"); many accessories; weight varies depending on format; 1976 factory prices, without lens, ranged from 952 DM to 3,281 DM
 Peco Supra, for 10 x 15 cm/9 x 12 cm/6.5 x 9 cm/6 x 6 cm/4.5 x 6 cm/4" x 5"/ 2-1/4 x 3-1/4"/ 2-1/4" x 2-1/4" large and medium formats (1954, discontinued in 1960); bellows view camera on a 500 mm-long (ca. 20") extendable flat optical bench monorail with rack teeth on extension sections atop each end, carrying the front and rear standards; swings, tilts, and rise/fall shifts on front standard, tilts and swings on rear standard plus revolving back; ground-glass geared focusing; fixed pleated leather bellows, or front-detachable to allow folding flat for transport or storage; quick-change lens boards; spirit levels on rear standard; all-metal construction of camera standards and monorail; used with plates, sheet-film, and roll-film; list price, not available
 Peco Universal III, for 18 x 24 cm/13 x 18 cm/ 12 x 16,5 cm/ 10 x 15 cm/ 9 x 12 cm, 6,5 x 8 cm/ 6x 6 cm/ or 8" x 10"/ 5" x 7"/ 4" x 5"/ 2-1/4" x 3-1/4"/ 2-1/4" x 2-1/4" large and medium formats (1960); bellows view camera on a 550 mm-long (26") tubular optical bench monorail with locking tripod collar; swings, tilts, rise/fall and side shifts for both front and rear standards; front-standard shoe for compendium; ground-glass focusing plus revolving back; interchangeable pleated leather bellows and wide-angle bellows; quick-change lens boards; all-metal construction of camera standards and monorail; used with plates, sheet-film and roll-film; camera conversion kit enabled 4" x 5" and 5" x 7" cameras to be converted to 8" x 10" format; 1962 list prices, NYC, ranged from $350 for the 4" x 5" model to $510 for the 8" x 10" model
 Peco Profia PL 1, for 9 x 12 cm to 6 x 7 cm (4" x 5" to 2-1/4 x 2-3/4") large and medium format sheet film, roll film or optional Plaubel 4" x 5" digital adapter PL70; international 4" x 5" back available (2012); bellows view camera with black front and rear L design standards (instead of U-shaped brackets) mounted on a black non-extendable 45 cm (18") tubular rack-and-pinion optical bench monorail, or optional 30 cm (12") or 75 cm (30") similar monorails; revolving back on rear standard; precision drives; center and base adjustments; zero detents; depth-of-field calculator; interchangeable standard pleated 9 x 12 cm (4" x 5") bellows ca. 55 cm (30") long for focal lengths from 110 mm; wide-angle bag bellows for focal lengths starting at 35 mm; flat lens board 165 mm x 165 mm (ca. 6-1/2" x 6-1/2"); locking tripod coupling collar; weight, 5.8 kg (ca. 12 lbs.) without lens or digital adapter; 2012 list price for the basic camera, without lens, starts at 2,375 Euros
 Peco Profia PL69D, for 6 x 9 cm to 24 x 37 mm / 2-1/4" x 3-1/4" to 35 mm medium and small film formats or optional Plaubel 6x9 digital adaptor PL69 (2012); bellows view camera with black front and rear L design standards (instead of U-shaped brackets) mounted on a black 30 cm (12") or 45 cm (ca. 18") optical bench tubular monorail; optional 30 cm (ca. 18") extension monorail; precision drives; center and base adjustments; zero detents; revolving back; three interchangeable 6 x 9 cm (2-1/4" x 3-1/4") black pleated bellows: standard is ca. 25 cm (ca. 10") long for focal lengths starting at 120 mm, optional extra-long pleated bellows is ca. 45 cm (ca. 18") long; and optional wide-angle bag bellows is ca. 15 cm (ca. 6") long for lenses ranging from 90 mm to 105 mm, or as short as 35 mm with the 24 mm-recessed lens board; all lens boards are 120 mm x 120 mm (ca. 5" x 5") but no lens boards are included in the camera price; tripod coupling collar; weight, 4.3 kg (ca. 8-1/2 lbs.) without lens or digital adaptor; 2012 list price for the basic camera, without lens or lens board, starts at 4,150 Euros, plus 1,420 Euros for the PL69D digital adaptor
 Peco Profia NT, available in three metric format sizes: 9 x 12 cm (to 6 x 7 cm with adaptor), 13 x 18 cm, and 18 x 24 cm; and three US formats: 4" x 5", 5" x 7", and 8" x 10"; all use a monorail bellows view camera design with fully adjustable front and rear U-shaped standard supports having center and base movements mounted on a black 45 cm (18") optical bench tubular monorail;  optional 45 cm monorail extension with mm scale; focusing is friction-driven; revolving back; international film backs available; interchangeable standard pleated and wide-angle bellows; minimum focal length for the standard bellows is 115 mm for all formats; minimum focal length for the wide-angle bellows with tube is 45 mm for all formats; length of the 9 x 12 cm / 4" x 5" bellows is about 55 cm (ca. 22"); length of the 13 x 18 cm / 5" x 7" bellows is about 60 cm (ca. 24"); length of the 18 x 24 cm / 8" x 10" bellows is about 65 cm (ca. 26"); the flat lens board is 165 mm x 165 mm (ca. 6-1/2" x 6-1/2"); tripod coupling collar; weights without lens: 5.8 kg (ca. 12 lbs.) for the 9 x 12 cm / 4" x 5" camera; and 6.4 kg (ca. 14 lbs) for both the 13 x 18 cm / 5" x 7" and 18 x 24 cm / 8" x 10" cameras; 2012 list prices range from 1,705 Euros to 3,345 Euros, plus options and lenses
 Peco Profia ZT, upgraded version of Profia NT, with precision drive, available in three metric format sizes: 9 x 12 cm, 13 x 18 cm, and 18 x 24 cm; and three US formats: 4" x 5", 5" x 7", and 8" x 10"; all use a monorail bellows view camera design with fully adjustable front and rear U-shaped standard supports having center and base movements mounted on a black 45 cm (18") optical bench tubular monorail; optional 45 cm monorail extension with mm scale; focusing is friction-driven; revolving back; international film backs available; interchangeable pleated and wide-angle bellows; minimum focal length for the standard bellows is 115 mm for all formats; minimum focal length for the wide-angle bellows with tube is 45 mm for all formats; length of the 9 x 12 cm /4" x 5" bellows is about 55 cm (ca. 22"); length of the 13 x 18 cm / 5" x 7" bellows is about 60 cm (ca. 24"); length of the 18 x 24 cm / 8" x 10" bellows is about 65 cm (ca. 26"); the flat lens board is 165 mm x 165 mm (ca. 6-1/5" x 6-1/2"); tripod coupling collar; Note that weights are heavier than the NT cameras; weights without lens: 6.3 kg (ca. 13 lbs) for the 9 x 12 cm / 4" x 5" camera; 6.9 kg (ca. 15 lbs) for the 13 x 18 cm camera; 7.9 kg (ca. 17-1/2 lbs) for the 18 x 24 cm / 8" x 10" camera; 2012 list prices range from 2,475 Euros to 4,204 Euros, plus options and lenses.

4.5×6 strut folding
 Baby Makina

6.5×9 strut folding
With adaptors for 120 film.
 Makina I
 Makina II
 Makina III
 Makina IIIR

45×107mm stereo strut folding
 Stereo Makina 45×107

6×13 stereo strut folding
 Stereo Makina 6×13

roll film (120 & 220)

4.5×6 folding
 Roll-Op and Roll-Op II (4.5×6 version)

6×6 folding
 Roll-Op and Roll-Op II (6×6 version)

6×7 strut folding
 Makinette 67
 Makina 67
 Makina W67
 Makina 670

6×9 view finder
 69W ProShift (with Schneider Super-Angulon 5,6/47 mm ultra-wide-angle lens)

6×9 monorail view cameras
 PL69D

6×10 Wide-Angle Camera
 Brooks-Plaubel Veriwide 100 (1959 - 1965); compact super-wide-angle roll-film camera with 100-degree field of view; designed in USA by Frank Rizzatti of Burleigh Brooks Inc. and manufactured in Germany by Plaubel; reportedly only 2,000 copies were built; camera body size: 4" x 6" x 1-1/2"; weight: 34 ounces; seven images 6 cm x 10 cm (2-1/4" x 3-1/2") on 120 roll-film; film advance by knob on top of camera, with  automatic frame-by-frame stop; frame counter window and shutter release with cable release socket on camera top; fixed six-element Schneider Super-Angulon f:8/47mm ultra-wide-angle lens; helical zone focusing with click stops at six feet and 20 feet; extreme depth of field (when set at 10 feet, depth extends from 4-1/2 feet to infinity); diaphragm stops from f/8 to f/32; no rangefinder; built-in flip-up wire finder with parallax adjustment on rear component; optional custom precise 100-degree Zeiss optical finder fits shoe on top of camera; Synchro-Compur leaf shutter, fully synchronized with M and X settings, built-in self-timer, speeds from 1 second to 1/500th second plus B; manual cocking; double exposure prevention; standard tripod socket in camera base; most units have three spirit levels for critical monitoring of horizontal, vertical and tilt positioning

Large Single Lens Reflex
 Makiflex - large single-lens reflex bellows camera (1963) uses interchangeable adapters to produce 9 cm x 9 cm (3-1/2" x 3-1/2") square images on 9 cm x 12 cm (or 4" x 5") plates or sheet-film, or 6 cm x 9 cm (2-1/4" x 3-1/4") oblong images, vertical or horizontal, on plates, sheet-film or roll-film, or 6 cm x 6 cm (2-1/4" x 2-1/4") square images on 120 roll-film; rotating camera back for easy vertical or horizontal composition changes; special quiet focal-plane shutter, with speeds from four seconds to 1/500th second; hand-triggered mirror to minimize chance of vibration; automatic spring diaphragm; square 120 mm x 120 mm (4-3/4" x 4-3/4") lens boards are interchangeable; ground-glass focusing screen in camera topside, with interchangeable folding viewfinder hood equipped with 2.5x magnifier lens; focusing uses a twin 70-mm-long rack-and-pinion drive; minimum focal length - about 125 mm; maximum focal length - about 360 mm; lens standard is rigid with no adjustments other than focusing;  bellows is not detachable
 Pecoflex - large single-lens reflex bellows camera (1963),  similar to Makiflex, except it replaces the twin rack-and-pinion focusing drive with an optical bench monorail with rack teeth and tripod socket; both the camera body and the lens standard can be ratcheted back and forth separately on the monorail; an adjustable view-camera-type front standard allows lens rise/fall, tilt and shift adjustments but not swing; bellows is interchangeable

127 film
 Makinette (3×4)

35mm film 
 Makinette 35P, prototypes only

16mm film
 Makinette 16, prototypes only

Lenses
Anastigmat-Tele-Peconar
Anticomar
Heli-Orthar
Triple-Orthar

References

External links

English
 Information on PL69D by The Big Picture
 Makina 67 review by Rob Gardiner
 Plaubel Makina review by Ken Rockwell
 Brooks Plaubel Veriwide 100 review  by Dante Stella
 Information on 69W ProShift by the Guide to Classic Cameras
 Photos using a Makina IIIR strut folding camera photos by R.J. Lam
 The Plaubel Makina II Press Camera 1930-1939 History of the Makina II folding camera
 Company history and cameras by Classic Cameras
 Plaubel Makina a unique Press Camera Brief overview on the Makina Press Camera
 Plaubel Cameras and History at Historic Camera

French
 Chambres Plaubel by Bernard Sulmon

German
 Plaubel website
 Overview on development and versions of the Makina III and 67
 The Plaubel Makina II Historical add
 Plaubel - Kameras aus Frankfurt Photoscala article on history and current range of Plaubel
 Plaubel Digital-Adapter PL70 Photoscala article on the Plaubel adapter for digital backs on view cameras

Photography companies of Germany
German cameras
Companies based in Frankfurt